Heather Logan-Sprenger (born 14 May 1982) is a professional road cyclist from Canada. She represented her nation at the 2009 UCI Road World Championships and the 2011 and 2012 Pan American Road and Track Championship. She competed in the US National Racing Calendar and the UCI's Women's World Tour race series from 2009-2013. In 2011 she won Stage 2 of the Tour of Gila and 3rd in Stage 3. She was the overall winner of the Green Sprint jersey for the 2011 Tour of Gila, NRC race in New Mexico. She also had many top 10 finishes in stages/races across the USA NRC calendar. 

Before transitioning to cycling in 2009, she (nee Logan) was the captain of the 2004 Under-22 (U22) Canadian National Women's Hockey team, a member of the team since 2002. She was the tournament MVP and leading scorer at the 2004 Air Canada Cup (Jr. World Championships) in Bad Tolz, Germany. As well, Heather was a member of Hockey Canada for six years (2002-2008) and played in the National Women's Hockey League (NWHL) for 10 seasons (2001-2011). She is an accomplished dual-sport national team athlete for Canada in both winter and summer sports.

Career 
Heather obtained her master's degree (MSc) in exercise physiology and doctoral degree (PhD) in exercise and nutritional physiology with a focus on skeletal muscle metabolism from the University of Guelph, Ontario, Canada in from 2006-2011. She is an active researcher and sport physiologist publishing in the field of sport physiology, metabolism, and performance. She is also a recognized mentor of women in sport science.

References

1982 births
Canadian female cyclists
Living people
Place of birth missing (living people)
20th-century Canadian women
21st-century Canadian women